Kastamonu Bld. GSK is the women's handball team of the same named club sponsored by the Municipality of Kastamonu, Turkey. The team competes in the Turkish Super League and the 2022–23 Women's EHF Champions League.

Colors
The club colors are white, red and black.

Competitions

Domestic
Kastamonu Bld. GSK compete in the Turkish Super League.

In July 2015, six notable players, including two Turkish Yeliz Yılmaz and Serpil İskenderoğlu as well as four foreigners Maja Kožnjak, Martin Pavic, Ivana Zafirova and Dorina Emilia Carbune, were transferred for the 2015–16 season.

In summer 2020, it was announced that the Danish handball coach Helle Thomsen, were joining the club as new head coach. Swedish handballer Julia Eriksson, also joined the club in December 2020, transferred from Lugi HF. In January 2021, the club bought the Norwegian handball star Amanda Kurtović, on loan from Győri Audi ETO KC.

International
The team was play in final EHF Challenge Cup where lost in with Gran Canaria 25–29 and 29–33. 
In the 2017-18 season, the team was in EHF Cup semi-final, where they list to SCM Craiova, who later won the EHF Cup that season. 

After the winner in Turkey league in the 2018-19 season the team got a chance in Qualification tournament in 2019–20 Women's EHF Champions League. In semifinal was win with ŽORK Jagodina 31–15. In the final the next day, they lost 33-35 to the host team from DHK Baník Most and dropped out of the Women's EHF Champions League. Due to qualification for the 2021–22 Women's EHF Champions League, four Montenegrins internationals Marina Rajčić, Jovanka Radičević, Milena Raičević and Majda Mehmedović, joined the club in the summer of 2021.

Kits

Honours
Turkish Handball Super League:
Winner: 2016–17, 2018–19
Silver: 2017-18
Bronze: 2014–15.
Women's EHF Cup:
Semi-finals: 2018
Women's EHF Challenge Cup:
Runners-up: 2016

Arena 
Arena: Kastamonu Merkez Sport Hall
Location: Kastamonu, Turkey
Capacity: 4000
Address: Saraçlar, Stadyum Cd., 37100 Kastamonu Merkez/Kastamonu

Team

Current squad
Squad for the 2022–23 season

Goalkeepers
 1  Yaren Berfe Göker
 58  Merve Durdu
Wingers
LW
 6  Kübra Sarikaya
 77  Majda Mehmedović
RW
 3   Nursah Sancak
 8  Simone Böhme
Line players
 14  Nurceren Akgün
 37  Ceren Coşkun 

Back players
LB
 19  Neslihan Çalışkan
 21  Betül Yılmaz
CB
 13  Serpil İskenderoğlu 
 20  Mouna Chebbah
RB
 2  Samara Vieira

Transfers
Transfers for the 2023–24 season

 Joining
  Aslı İskit (LB) (from  CS Măgura Cisnădie)
  Tanja Ašanin (RB) (from  SCM Râmnicu Vâlcea)
  Fatos Kücükyildiz (CB) (from  Neckarsulmer SU)

 Leaving
  Serpil İskenderoğlu (CB) (retires)
  Mouna Chebbah (CB) (retires)
  Neslihan Çalışkan (LB) (to  ŽRK Budućnost Podgorica)
  Katarina Ježić (LP) (to  HC Dunărea Brăila)
 Simone Bohme (to  CSM Tîrgu-Jiu)

Technical staff
Technical staff for the 2022–23 season
  Head Coach: Claus Mogensen
  Assistant coach: Serkan Mehmet Inci
  Goalkeeping coach: Erdal Kaynak
  Physiotherapist: Nurşen İNCE

Formerly known players from the club

  Serpil Çapar
  Derya Tınkaoğlu
  Yasemin Güler
  Aslı İskit
  Gonca Nahcıvanlı
  Olha Vashchuk
  Sevilay İmamoğlu Öcal
  Yeliz Yılmaz
  Neslihan Yakupoğlu
  Yeliz Yılmaz
  Yeliz Özel
  Seda Yörükler
  Perihan Topaloğlu
  Jovanka Radičević
  Marina Rajčić
  Milena Raičević
  Vanesa Agović
  Sonja Barjaktarović
  Ljubica Nenezić
  Nina Bulatović
  Kristina Elez
  Žana Čović
  Andrea Šerić
  Maja Kožnjak
  Patricia Batista da Silva
  Jaqueline Anastácio
  Elaine Gomes
  Olga Laiuk
  Yuliya Snopova
  Yana Uskova
  Anastasia Sinitsyna
  Katarzyna Kołodziejska
  Joanna Wołoszyk
  Lenche Ilkova
  Dorina Emilia Carbune
  Sondes Hachana
  Nataliya Kotsina
  Amanda Kurtović
  Sára Kovářová

References

Turkish handball clubs
Women's handball in Turkey
Sport in Kastamonu